Feng Xinduo (born January 24, 1992, in Dalian, Liaoning, China) is a Chinese idol singer and a member of Chinese idol girl group SNH48. From February 13, 2015, to December 22, 2017, she served as the captain of Team NII.

Career
On 18 August 2013, Feng was among the 34 shortlisted candidates for second-generation members of SNH48, and made her debut at Team NII's 1st Stage, "Theater no Megami" on 2 November. On 11 November, it was announced that Feng will be one of 24 members in Team NII during the team inauguration ceremony. On 16 November, she participated in SNH48's first major concert, "SNH48 Guangzhou Concert", held in the Guangzhou International Sports Arena.

On 18 January 2014, Feng participated in the Kouhaku Utagassen to commemorate SNH48's first anniversary. On July 26, she came in seventh for the Online Popularity Award during SNH48's first "General Election".

On 31 January 2015, on SNH48 Request Hour Setlist Best 30 2015, Feng's performance of "Enjou Rousen" with Li Yitong was ranked 10th. On 13 February, it was announced that she would be the captain of Team NII. On 25 July, Feng was ranked 12th in SNH48's second General Election with 22,028.7 votes,

On July 30, 2016, during SNH48's third General Election, Feng was ranked fifth with 88,598.8 votes.

On April 1, 2017, Feng became a regular cast member of variety show Brain Boom. On July 29, during SNH48's fourth General Election, Feng came in fourth with 133607.1 votes. On December 22, Feng resigned from her position as captain of Team NII in light of an internal conflict within the team involving member Li Yitong.

On July 28, 2018, Feng was ranked third with 174,020.18 votes during the fifth general election. This is the first time that she was named on Top3 of the whole SNH48 Group.

Discography

With SNH48

EPs

Albums
 Mae Shika Mukanee (2014)

Units

SNH48 Stage Units

Concert units

Filmography

Variety shows

References

External links
 Official Member Profile 
 
 

1992 births
Living people
SNH48 members
21st-century Chinese actresses
Chinese television actresses
Musicians from Dalian
Singers from Liaoning
Actresses from Dalian